Port Arthur is a city in Jefferson County within the Beaumont–Port Arthur metropolitan area of the U.S. state of Texas. The largest oil refinery in the United States, the Motiva Refinery, is located in Port Arthur.

The population of Port Arthur was 53,818 at the 2010 census, down from 57,755 at the 2000 census. By 2020, its population rebounded to 56,039. Early attempts at settlements in the area had all failed. However, in 1895, Arthur Stilwell founded Port Arthur, and the town quickly grew. Port Arthur was incorporated as a city in 1898 and soon developed into a seaport. It eventually became the center of a large oil refinery network. The Rainbow Bridge across the Neches River connects Port Arthur to Bridge City.

Port Arthur is vulnerable to hurricanes and extensive damage to the city has been caused several times.

History
It is a saltwater estuary formed by the confluence of the Neches and Sabine Rivers.

The town was conceived in 1837, and in 1840 promoters led by Almanzon Huston were offering town lots for sale. Some were sold, but Huston's project failed to attract many settlers. The area next was known as "Sparks", after John Sparks, who moved his family to the shores of Sabine Lake near the site of Aurora. However, the American Civil War soon began, and rail lines were removed. In 1886, a destructive hurricane hit the coast, causing the remaining residents to dismantle their homes and move to Beaumont. By 1895, Aurora had become a ghost town.

Arthur Stilwell led the resettling of the area as part of his planned city as the southern terminus of his Kansas City, Pittsburg and Gulf Railroad, predecessor to the Kansas City Southern Railway. Stilwell named the city Port Arthur after himself, not the British Royal Navy Lieutenant who gave his name to Port Arthur, China.

Pleasure Island now separates the city from the Gulf Intracoastal Waterway. The  man-made island was created between 1899 and 1908 by the Corps of Engineers to support development of the port.

Arthur Stilwell founded the Port Arthur Channel and Dock Company to manage the port facilities. The port officially opened with the arrival of the British steamer Saint Oswald in 1899.

When oil was discovered at Spindletop, the J.M. Guffey Petroleum Company, later Gulf Oil, had run pipelines to Port Arthur as a shipping point and a location for an oil refinery.  In November 1901, the first tanker, the Cardium, departed with Spindletop oil.  The refinery was enlarged in 1902, and a pipeline connected to the Glenn Pool Oil Reserve in Oklahoma.  The Texas Company, later Texaco, also started building a refinery in 1902.  By 1916, the Port Arthur refinery was one of the three largest in the United States.

In 2015, the city council proposed an ordinance to declare Port Arthur a "film friendly city."

In October 2021, Governor Abbott announced that Port Arthur has been declared a "film friendly city" by the Texas Film Commission.

Geography
Port Arthur is located on the eastern edge of Jefferson County at  (29.884864, −93.939902), on the west side of Sabine Lake. It is bordered to the northeast by Orange County, Texas, and to the southeast, across Sabine Lake, by Cameron Parish, Louisiana. The Port Arthur city limits extend south along the west side of Sabine Pass, the outlet of Sabine Lake, as far as the Gulf of Mexico on the city's southern border. To the north, the city limits extend across the Neches River into Orange County. Port Arthur is bordered to the northwest by the cities of Nederland, Groves, and Port Neches, and to the northeast by Bridge City in Orange County.

Communities
Communities in Port Arthur include:
 El Vista
 Griffing Park
 Lakeview
 Pear Ridge
 Port Acres
 Sabine Pass
 West Side

Tropical cyclones

Hurricane of September 12, 1897 
Celebrations in Port Arthur on completion of the Kansas City, Pittsburg and Gulf Railroad between Kansas City and Port Arthur occurred Saturday, September 11, 1897. The celebrations brought additional people into town.  The next day, a major hurricane hit Port Arthur.  Water flowed five feet deep in the streets.  People loaded into the unfinished railroad roundhouse seeking shelter; the building promptly collapsed, killing four.  In the end, 13 people died, homes were destroyed, and a pleasure pier was severely damaged.

Hurricane Audrey 
In June 1957, Hurricane Audrey made landfall just east of Port Arthur in Cameron Parish, Louisiana, as a category 3 hurricane. The storm caused extensive wind damage around the city and significant storm surge flooding just east in Southwest Louisiana.

Hurricane Rita 
On September 24, 2005, Hurricane Rita made landfall between Sabine Pass, Texas, and Johnson Bayou, Louisiana, as a category 3 hurricane. The storm caused widespread significant wind damage throughout the city, with power outages lasting several weeks in some locations. Some areas of the city also received flooding due to Rita.

Hurricane Humberto 
On September 13, 2007, Hurricane Humberto made landfall west of Port Arthur as a category 1 hurricane. The storm moved northeast across the Golden Triangle, causing widespread wind damage; however, most of the damage was relatively minor. An  wind gust was recorded at the Southeast Texas Regional Airport just northwest of the city.

Tropical Storm Edouard 
On August 5, 2008, Tropical Storm Edouard made landfall just west of Port Arthur.

Hurricane Ike 
On September 13, 2008, Hurricane Ike made landfall on Galveston Island as a category 2 hurricane. Due to the storm's unusually large size, effects were widespread and were felt across much of Southeast Texas. Port Arthur sustained significant wind damage and many of the city's residents lost power. The Port Arthur seawall protected the city from the major flooding that surrounding cities experienced.

Hurricane Harvey 
On August 29, 2017, after Harvey made a second landfall at tropical storm status, 26 inches of rain fell in a single day at the airport near Port Arthur, triggering widespread flash flooding in the city. According to the Port Arthur mayor Derrick Freeman, 20,000 homes were flooded with up to 6 ft of water. On August 30, Freeman posted on Facebook, "Our whole city is underwater right now."

Hurricane Laura 
Hurricane Laura was expected to make landfall as a major hurricane with Port Arthur in its direct path. Port Arthur was evacuated. However, turning almost due north, Laura ended up making its final landfall near Cameron, Louisiana.

Climate 
Port Arthur is tied with Lake Charles, Louisiana, and Astoria, Oregon, as the most humid city in the contiguous United States. The average relative humidity is 90% in the morning, and 72% in the afternoon.

Demographics 

At the 2010 census, 53,818 people, 20,183 households, and 13,191 families resided in the city. The population density was 654.6 people per square mile (250.5/km). The 23,577 housing units averaged 284.4 per square mile (109.8/km). At the 2020 census, the population increased to 56,039. The racial makeup of the city was 41.7% African American, 37.9% White, 1.2% Native American, 6.3% Asian, 0.1% Pacific Islander, and 15.3% from other races in 2010. Hispanics or Latino Americans of any race were 29.6% of the population. In 2019, the American Community Survey estimated 18.7% of the population was non-Hispanic white, 38.1% Black and African American, 0.2% Native American, 7.3% Asian, 0.1% Pacific Islander, 0.2% some other race, and 34.5% Hispanic or Latino American of any race.

Of the 20,183 households in 2010, 30.2% had children under the age of 18 living with them, 39.2% were married couples living together, 19.8% had a female householder with no husband present, and 34.6% were not families; 30.1% of all households were made up of individuals, and 11.1% had someone living alone who was 65 years of age or older. The average household size was 2.63 and the average family size was 3.31. In the city, the population was distributed as 27.0% under the age of 18, 9.7% from 18 to 24, 24.7% from 25 to 44, 25.2% from 45 to 64, and 13.3% who were 65 years of age or older. The median age was 35.3 years. For every 100 females, there were 96.9 males. For every 100 females age 18 and over, there were 94.1 males.

From 2014 to 2019, the median household income was $36,557; families had a median income of $44,115; married families $56,304; and non-family households $24,280. Among the population, 27.2% lived at or below the poverty line, against the state's 13.6% impoverished population from 2014 to 2019 census estimates. In contrast, the nearby city of Beaumont had a poverty rate of 16.7%, down from 17.6%.

Economy

Home to a large portion of United States oil refining capacity, Port Arthur has seen renewed investment in several key installations. This $10.0 billion project is the largest U..S refinery expansion to occur in 30 years. Premcor Refining (now Valero) completed a $775 million expansion of its petrochemical plant, and BASF/Fina commenced operations of a new $1.75 billion gasification and cogeneration unit on premises of its current installation, which had just completed its own $1 billion upgrade. These operations are supported by the Port of Port Arthur, one of Texas' leading seaports. Port Arthur still suffers, though,  from one of the highest unemployment rates in the state.

The city was the site of an oil spill in 2010, when an oil tanker and barge collided, causing 450,000 gallons of oil to spill into the Sabine/Neches waterway alongside the city.

Central business district disintegration
The commercial center of Port Arthur was at its peak in the early 1900s. Together with the effects of suburbanization, which drew off wealthier residents to new housing away from town, gradually taking businesses with them, from 1960 until 1974, successive waves of economic recession caused much distress in the town. The central business district has many boarded up and vacant locations.

Hotel Sabine
The Hotel Sabine opened at 600 Proctor Street in 1929 and operated as the Vaughn Hotel until the mid-1930s. At 118 feet, 10 stories, and the tallest building in Port Arthur, the building is of Beaux-Arts architecture style, built with steel-reinforced concrete and brick on 640 steel-laced wooden cypress pilings driven 60 ft into the ground. It was designed to withstand the most severe coastal storms. The hotel closed down in the mid-1980s.

The Port Arthur News reported August 28, 2010, that "DWA (Digital Workforce Academy) Buys Sabine Hotel", By November 2011, the hotel was reported to be slated for demolition. The cost of renovations were estimated at $10,000,000–12M dollars and demolition estimates as $500,000 to $1.2 million. As of April, 2021, Motiva was still considering buying the hotel, but remained uncertain and uncommitted to it. 

Hurricane Rita struck a direct hit on the Proctor Street Seawall, and damaged many downtown businesses and homes. As economic activity picked up in the region, calls for downtown revitalization have been advanced. The true center of commercial activity has gravitated from downtown to other areas. The main shopping center is Central Mall, opened outside the downtown in 1982.

Arts and culture
Port Arthur's Museum of the Gulf Coast is recognized as the area's definitive collection of items and displays for figures from Port Arthur and the surrounding communities.

Government

The mayor of Port Arthur is Thurman "Bill" Bartie.

The county operates the Jefferson County Sub-Courthouse in Port Arthur.

Politics 

 Nat R. Strong, 1898–1899 
 Charles Eugene Smith, 1899–1902
 Rome H. Woodworth, 1902–1905
 Joseph P. Landes, 1905–1906
 J.H. Drummond, 1906–1908
 P.C. Pfeiffer, 1908–1911
 George N. Bliss, 1911–1915
 R.H. Dunn, 1915–1917
 John W. Tryon, 1917–1921
 James Pinckney Logan, 1921–1929, 1931–1932, 1950–1952
 J.W. O'Neal, 1929–1931
 H.M. Smith, 1932–1933
 H.O. Preston, 1933–1934
 E.R. Winstel, 1934–1935
 Fred L. Bachert, 1935–1936, 1939–1940
 Inman H. Wheless, 1936–1937
 Frank J. Imhoff, 1937–1938
 Neal D. Rader, 1938–1939
 L.C. Heare, 1940–1942
 R.L. Rutan, 1942–1944
 Leland Lacy, 1944–1945
 Walter H. Bailey, 1945–1947
 H.L. Crow, 1947–1948
 James Walter Long, 1948–1950
 Chris F. Petersen, 1952–1953
 Myron J. Babin Jr., 1953–1954
 Nick Norris, 1954
 A.L. Gillman, 1954
 C.R. Eisler, 1954–1957, 1959–1960, 1960–1961
 Zane Q. Johnson, 1957–1958
 M.B. Avila, 1958–1959
 Herman T. Schneider, 1960
 Harvie A. Parker, 1961–1963
 R. B. McCollum, 1963
 Lloyd Hayes, 1963–1969
 Bernis Sadler, 1969–1984
 Malcolm Clark, 1984–1990
 Mary Ellen Summerlin, 1990–1994
 Robert T. Morgan Jr., 1994–1998
 Oscar Ortiz, 1998–2007
 Delores "Bobbi" Prince, 2007–2016
 Derrick Freeman, 2016–2019
 Thurman Bartie, 2019–present

The United States Postal Service operates the Port Arthur Post Office, the Port Acres Post Office, and the Sabine Pass Post Office in Sabine Pass.

Education

Colleges

Lamar State College-Port Arthur 

Located in downtown Port Arthur, celebrated its 100th birthday in 2009. Offering a full variety of basic core curriculum classes in which credits are transferable throughout Texas public universities, Lamar State College is recognized for associate programs in commercial music, nursing, legal assistant, and process technology. The college also fields competitive teams in men's basketball and women's softball.

Galveston College (for Sabine Pass) 
The section of Port Arthur within the Sabine Pass School District is assigned to Galveston College in Galveston.

Career and Technical Education Center 
It was formerly named Stilwell Technical Center and is the second college in Port Arthur. The Port Arthur Independent School District is now headquartered at its former location on 9th Avenue. In 2012 the school was relocated to a new building built on the same property of Memorial High School at 3501 Sgt Lucian Adams Dr.

Primary and secondary schools 
Most of the city is served by the Port Arthur Independent School District. It operates a single high school, Memorial High School, formed in 2002 by the consolidation of three high schools: Stephen F. Austin, Abraham Lincoln, and Thomas Jefferson.

The portion around Southeast Texas Regional Airport is served by the Nederland Independent School District. Some parts are served by Port Neches-Groves Independent School District. The Sabine Pass community is served by the Sabine Pass Independent School District.

The Bob Hope Charter School is located in Port Arthur.

It formerly had a Catholic high school, Bishop Byrne High School, which closed in 1983.

Public libraries
The Port Arthur Public Library, at 4615 9th Avenue at Texas State Highway 73, serves as the public library system for the city.

Media

Newspapers 
The Port Arthur News is the only daily newspaper serving Port Arthur. Operating since 1897 The News is one of the oldest continually operated businesses in Port Arthur. It is currently owned and operated by Boone Newspapers. From 1932–1941 Port Arthur had a second newspaper called The Peoples Press.

Television 
 KBTV (Dabl) channel 4

Radio

Transportation

Air
The Jack Brooks Regional Airport in the northwest part of Port Arthur serves Beaumont and Port Arthur.

Bus
Local bus service is provided by Port Arthur Transit.

Rail
The nearest inter-city rail station to Port Arthur is Beaumont station in nearby Beaumont, which serves the greater area. The station is served by Amtrak’s Sunset Limited line, with a train arriving thrice weekly in each direction.

Notable people

 Lucian Adams, recipient of Medal of Honor, Bronze Star, and Purple Heart
 Jonathan Babineaux, professional football player
 Jordan Babineaux, professional football player
 G.W. Bailey, actor
 Zachary Breaux, jazz musician
 Aaron Brown, professional football player
 J'Covan Brown (born 1990), basketball player in the Israel Basketball Premier League
 Jamaal Charles, professional football player
 C. J. Chenier, musician
 Babe Didrikson Zaharias, American athlete who excelled in golf, basketball, baseball and track and field
 Todd Dodge, American football coach
 Ted Dunbar, jazz musician
 Earl Evans, college and professional basketball player
 Kevin Everett, professional football player
 Mitch Gaspard, college baseball coach
 John Warne Gates, wire and steel magnate, railroad and oil financier
 Danny Gorrer, professional football player
 Jason Halbert, musical director for Kelly Clarkson
 Kree Harrison, runner-up on American Idol, 12th season
 Lee Hazlewood, musician, was raised in Port Arthur.
 Tom Hicks,  former owner of Texas Rangers, Dallas Stars, Liverpool FC, and Dr Pepper/7-UP
 Jim Hurtubise, race car driver, moved to Port Arthur as an adult.
 Stephen Jackson, former professional basketball player, who played in the NBA for 14 seasons
 Jimmy Johnson, football broadcaster, player, coach, and executive
 Janis Joplin, singer/songwriter
 Evelyn Keyes, American film actress
 Bobby Leopold, professional football player
 Kenneth Lofton Jr., college and FIBA U-19 Team USA player
 Inika McPherson, track and field athlete
 Donald Narcisse, player in Canadian Football League
 Pimp C & Bun B of UGK, rappers
 Johnny Preston, pop singer
 Robert Rauschenberg, painter and graphic artist
 Leah Rhodes, Hollywood costume designer
 J.P. Richardson aka "The Big Bopper", singer and songwriter born in the Port Arthur neighborhood of Sabine Pass
 Elandon Roberts, professional football player
 Raymond Strother, political consultant
 Tad Tadlock, choreographer
 Joe Washington, college and professional football player
 Ken Webster, actor and director

See also

 List of oil pipelines
 List of oil refineries

Notes

References

External links

 City of Port Arthur official website
 Historic Article on Port Arthur (WWII)
 Many historical photographs of Port Arthur
 Port Arthur, TX at City-Data.com

 
1899 establishments in Texas
Cities in Jefferson County, Texas
Cities in Texas
Cities in the Beaumont–Port Arthur metropolitan area
Port cities and towns in Texas
Ports of the Gulf of Mexico
Populated coastal places in Texas
Railway towns in Texas